Celuta (minor planet designation: 186 Celuta) is a 50 km Main belt asteroid. It was discovered by the French astronomers Paul Henry and Prosper Henry on April 6, 1878. This was the last discovery credited to the Prosper brothers. It is classified as an S-type asteroid.

The asteroid is named after Céluta, a female character in two works of fiction by François-René de Chateaubriand, Atala (1801) and René (1802). The Henry brothers had already named another of their discoveries, 152 Atala, after the heroine of Atala. Both Atala and Céluta are American Indian fictional characters.

Photometric observations of this asteroid at the Organ Mesa Observatory in Las Cruces, New Mexico during 2010 gave a light curve with a period of 19.842 ± 0.001 hours and a brightness variation of 0.54 ± 0.02 in magnitude.

References

External links 
 
 

000186
Discoveries by Paul Henry and Prosper Henry
Named minor planets
000186
000186
18780406
François-René de Chateaubriand